Vasiti Soko is a Fijian geographic information system (GIS) specialist and the director of the National Disaster Management Office (NDMO) of Fiji. In October 2021, she was the recipient of the inaugural Women's International Network for Disaster Risk Reduction (WIN DRR) Leadership Award, from the United Nations Office for Disaster Risk Reduction (UNDRR).

Education
Vasiti Soko obtained a BA from the University of the South Pacific (USP) in Suva, Fiji in 2006, together with a diploma in GIS. In 2018 she obtained a master's in geodesy and spatial science from the RMIT University in Melbourne, Australia.

Career
After graduating from USP, Soko undertook a variety of assignments in Asia and the Pacific related to global information systems, including in Thailand, Australia and several Micronesian countries. Between 2013 and 2016 she worked for Fij's Sugar Industry Tribunal as its GIS Manager, creating a GIS web portal that linked Fiji's four main sugarcane mills remotely and published live harvesting data during the cane crushing season. She also worked on updating Fiji's maritime boundary. In 2019, after completing her master's, she was appointed as the first woman director of the National Disaster Management Office (NDMO). She is currently the co-chair for the Pacific Technical Working Group (TWG) on Human Mobility, deputy chair for the Asia – Pacific TWG on Disaster-related Statistics and co- chair of the Pacific Response to Disaster Displacement Advisory Board. 

On taking up the position as NDMO director, Soko rapidly became known to the people of Fiji as a result of her press briefings. She became the first NDMO Director to introduce sign language in all media briefings.

Awards and honours
In October 2021, Soko became the inaugural Women's International Network for Disaster Risk Reduction (WIN DRR) Excellence in Leadership Award recipient, which is given by UNDRR in association with Australian Aid. The award was announced on the International Day for Disaster Reduction. UNDRR noted that she had strengthened Fiji's disaster risk governance through improved disaster risk reduction policies and laws, and had found new ways to engage women and people with disabilities.

References

External links
Press conference by Vasiti Soko on Tropical Cyclone Ana, January 2021

Living people
Fijian people
Fijian scientists
Fijian women
University of the South Pacific alumni
RMIT University alumni
Year of birth missing (living people)